Demolis is a genus of moths in the family Erebidae. The genus was erected by George Hampson in 1901.

Species
Demolis albicostata
Demolis albitegula

Former species
Demolis eugenia
Demolis flavithorax
Demolis ridenda

References

External links

Phaegopterina
Moth genera